Folashade Adefisayo is a Nigerian academic and a teacher, and she is the current commissioner of Lagos State Ministry of Education.

Education 
She attended the University of Ibadan where she received a bachelor's degree in Zoology. Later, she moved to Lagos State University were she obtained Master's Degree in Business Administration and to the University of Nottingham, where she obtained another master's degree in Education.

Career 
Folashade set a programme to  improve students in Computer Base Test (CBT), after a long lockdown of COVID-19 in Lagos State, the programme is set to improve about 1.5 million students across Lagos State and Nigeria. She also ordered promotion of students of Lagos to next class by considering their continue assessment (CA Test). Prior to becoming a commissioner in Lagos State,  Folashade worked in the Banking and education sector.Folashade has a forty years job experience altogether.

Personal life 
Folashade was born and raised in Lagos and Ibadan, Nigeria; she is the eldest daughter among five members of her family, and she likes reading and travelling.

See also
Executive Council of Lagos State

References

External links 

Nigerian academics
People from Lagos State
Living people
University of Ibadan alumni
University of Lagos alumni
Year of birth missing (living people)
Commissioners of state ministries in Nigeria
Nigerian women academics